Chi-Raq is a 2015 American musical crime comedy drama film, directed and produced by Spike Lee and co-written by Lee and Kevin Willmott. Set in Chicago, the film focuses on the gang violence prevalent in neighborhoods on the city's south side, particularly the Englewood neighborhood.

The story is based on Aristophanes' Lysistrata, a classical Greek comedy play in which women withhold sex from their husbands to put an end to the Peloponnesian War. It stars Nick Cannon, Wesley Snipes, Teyonah Parris, Jennifer Hudson, Angela Bassett, John Cusack, and Samuel L. Jackson.

It was the first film to be produced by Amazon Studios, released in select theaters on December 4, 2015, and on their video on demand service Amazon Instant Video on December 29.

Plot
In Chicago's Southside, as the events are narrated by Dolemedes, a war rages between two rival gangs: the Spartans, led by rapper/gang leader Demetrius Dupree, nicknamed "Chi-Raq" and the Trojans, led by gang lord Cyclops. Demetrius's lover, Lysistrata, grows disillusioned after several outbursts of violence near her, including a shootout at Demetrius's concert, an arson attack at their home while the two are having sex and a young girl, Patti, being accidentally killed in a gang shooting, revealed as the daughter of Irene.

After the fire, Lysistrata moves in with Miss Helen Worthy, a well-read non-violence advocate who suggests she research about Leymah Gbowee, who led a peace movement to stop the Second Liberian Civil War and threatened a sex strike. Inspired by Worthy and Gbowee, Lysistrata organizes a meeting between herself, the Spartans' lovers and the Trojans' lovers, where they agree to withhold sex until the men agree to lay down arms, hence their plea, "No Peace, No Pussy."

The strike rapidly spreads across the city, with women of many neighborhoods and occupations joining the boycott. Despite the strike's enormous membership, the Spartans and the Trojans refuse to cease their war. Following a funeral for Irene's young daughter Patti, Lysistrata speaks with the local preacher Fr. Mike Corridan, who argues passionately against the American institutions that profit from the South Side's wars. Deciding that the problem is bigger than the gangs' resentment, Lysistrata and her women seduce their way into a military armory and capture it from its soldiers and their general, General King Kong.

The takeover of the armory sparks a national crisis, with the military and the police surrounding the site. The forces are barred from storming the armory as it was taken by merely 75 unarmed women who are not holding any hostages. The women's actions also cause their boycott to become famous worldwide, with women from countries all over the world organizing their own sex strikes. Planned by Mayor McCloud and Commissioner Blades, the military tries to lure the women in the armory out by playing seductive music but it fails after the women find the military's earplugs and the men themselves become unbearably turned on by the music, thus missing their women even more.

After three months, Cyclops's and Demetrius's gangs begin to grow disillusioned, from the absence of sex and from having plenty of time to think over their fate in a gang. Demetrius remains too stubborn to give up the Spartans but agrees to organize a meeting with Lysistrata after the boycott spreads to Mayor McCloud's wife and to the first lady of the United States. The city arranges a deal: Demetrius and Lysistrata will meet each other in bed and whoever climaxes first loses and must agree to the other's terms. The deal is cut short by Cyclops arriving to declare he and the Trojans are laying down their guns.

A truce is organized the following day, with Lysistrata, Mayor McCloud, and Cyclops signing a deal to end gun violence and build new hospitals and trauma centers. Demetrius refuses to sign and walks away but is ultimately moved by Miss Worthy's testimony of the death of her daughter, as confessed to by Demetrius's father, Jamel Dupree. He admits that he was the one who killed Irene's daughter and gives himself up for arrest.

Cast

 Nick Cannon as Demetrius "Chi-Raq" Dupree
 Wesley Snipes as  Sean "Cyclops" Andrews
 Teyonah Parris as Lysistrata
 Anya Engel-Adams as Rasheeda
 Jennifer Hudson as Irene
 Angela Bassett as Miss Helen Worthy
 John Cusack as Fr. Mike Corridan
 Samuel L. Jackson as Dolemedes
 Michelle Mitchenor as Indigo 
 D.B. Sweeney as Mayor McCloud
 Harry J. Lennix as Commissioner Blades
 La La Anthony as Hecuba
 Felicia Pearson as Dania
 Jay Washington as Besomighty
 Dave Chappelle as Morris
 Steve Harris as Ole Duke
 David Patrick Kelly as General King Kong
 Irma P. Hall as Dr. Miss Aesop
 Isiah Whitlock, Jr. as Bacchos

Production

Casting
Rapper Kanye West was supposed to star in the film but dropped out, possibly due to scheduling conflicts. On July 21, 2015, it was announced that La La Anthony, Nick Cannon, Wesley Snipes, Jennifer Hudson, Angela Bassett, John Cusack, and Samuel L. Jackson had joined the cast. Dave Chappelle appeared in the film as the owner of a strip club. This film saw Lee reuniting with Bassett, Jackson, and Snipes, having worked with all three actors on earlier films such as Mo' Better Blues, Jungle Fever and Malcolm X.

Filming
Principal photography began in June 2015 and continued production through July. The project hired many local actors and had an open casting call in Chicago on May 9, 2015.

Music

Chi-Raq: Original Motion Picture Soundtrack, featuring music from the film, was released via digital download and physical formats on December 4, 2015, through RCA Records.

Release

Theatrical
Chi-Raq was the first original film to be distributed by Amazon Studios In addition, Roadside Attractions and Lionsgate partnered with the company for a limited release in theaters on December 4, 2015, with the film premiering on Amazon Instant Video.

Marketing
The first trailer for the film was released November 3, 2015.

Reception

Box office
The film had a limited release into North American theaters on December 4, 2015. It grossed $1,250,224 from 305 theaters in its opening weekend, including a $15,000+ per screen average on 22 screens in Chicago.

Critical response
Chi-Raq received generally positive reviews from critics. On Rotten Tomatoes, the film has rating of 82%, based on 151 reviews, an average rating of 7.35/10. The site's critical consensus states, "Chi-Raq is as urgently topical and satisfyingly ambitious as it is wildly uneven – and it contains some of Spike Lee's smartest, sharpest, and all-around entertaining late-period work." Metacritic reports a score of 77 out of 100, based on 37 critics, indicating "generally favorable reviews".

Metacritic also found Chi-Raq to be tied with Steve Jobs as the 27th most acclaimed film of 2015, with five critics having named it the year's greatest and 18 others having ranked it in third place or below.

Accolades

Controversies
The November film trailer was controversial. Criticism included an op-ed in the Chicago Tribune by emergency physician Amy Ho, who argued (before the film's release) that Chicago deaths occurring nightly in local hospitals were used for the purpose of entertainment. Critiques of a similar vein were published on Twitter and other social media sites.

The term "Chi-Raq" is a portmanteau of Chicago and Iraq, as well as an endonym used by some Chicago non-residents to liken the area to a war zone due to its high crime rates. City residents and city council members requested that Lee change the name of the film, and threatened to withhold tax credits that the filmmaker would receive from the city. Lee later called Chicago Mayor Rahm Emanuel a "bully" and several Chicago aldermen "bootlickers" for their criticisms.

The film's production received more negative press when it was discovered that its music supervisor Thomas "DJ Slugo" Kendricks was charging artists a submission fee in order to have their music considered for the soundtrack. These measures were taken to the film's production team, and Kendricks was fired.

See also
List of black films of the 2010s
List of hood films

References

External links
 
 
 
 
 

2015 films
2010s crime comedy-drama films
2010s musical comedy-drama films
2010s satirical films
American crime comedy-drama films
American musical comedy-drama films
American satirical films
Films based on works by Aristophanes
Films scored by Terence Blanchard
Films directed by Spike Lee
Films set in Chicago
Films shot in Chicago
Films with screenplays by Spike Lee
Films based on ancient Greek plays
Amazon Studios films
Vertigo Films films
Works based on Lysistrata
2015 comedy films
2015 drama films
Films produced by Spike Lee
Films with screenplays by Kevin Willmott
40 Acres and a Mule Filmworks films
2010s English-language films
2010s American films